Rini Mariani Soemarno (born 9 June 1958) is an Indonesian economist and was the Minister of State-Owned Enterprises in President Joko Widodo's Working Cabinet. She graduated from Wellesley College, Massachusetts, in 1981. She served as Minister of Trade and Industry in Megawati Sukarnoputri's Mutual Assistance Cabinet from 2001 to 2004.

References

External links 
 

1958 births
Government ministers of Indonesia
Javanese people
Living people
Wellesley College alumni
Working Cabinet (Joko Widodo)
Trade ministers of Indonesia
Industry ministers of Indonesia